is a Japanese footballer currently playing as a winger for Yokohama F. Marinos.

Career statistics

Club
.

Notes

References

External links

2001 births
Living people
Japanese footballers
Japan youth international footballers
Association football forwards
J1 League players
J2 League players
J3 League players
Yokohama F. Marinos players
SC Sagamihara players
Omiya Ardija players